Doc Marie's is an LGBT-friendly bar in Portland, Oregon.

Description and history

Doc Marie's is an LGBT-friendly bar in the Osborn Hotel building in southeast Portland's Buckman neighborhood. Owned by Olga Bichko and Nikki Ferry, the business is named after Marie Equi, a lesbian described by Brooke Jackson-Glidden of Eater Portland as "one of Oregon's fiercest champions for labor and women's rights". The business operates as Portland's only lesbian bar, in a space which previously housed Elvis Room.

In March 2022, Eater Portland mentioned plans for the bar to open in May. The business began operating on July 1, but closed the following day after two managers resigned and other employees created a worker cooperative. According to Shane Dixon Kavanaugh of The Oregonian, the workers "demanded the bar's owners turn the business over to them, writing on Instagram that they felt 'misled about the space being safe and welcoming. The conflict was picked up by Libs of TikTok, a popular conservative Twitter account, resulting in threats directed at the owners and former employees. The bar is slated to reopen on August 13, 2022.

See also 

 History of lesbianism in the United States

References

External links

 
 

2022 establishments in Oregon
Buckman, Portland, Oregon
Lesbian culture in Oregon
Lesbian history in the United States
LGBT culture in Portland, Oregon
LGBT drinking establishments in Oregon
Restaurants established in 2022
Restaurants in Portland, Oregon